Kati Cercle is an administrative subdivision of the Koulikoro Region of Mali. Its seat is the town of Kati, which is also its largest town. It lies at the southwest corner of the region, and completely surrounds the Bamako Capital District. Until the capital was hived off in 1977, the combined Cercle was called Bamako Cercle, with the capital city as its seat.

Kati Cercle is home to primarily Bambara and Malinke farmers, as well as Bozo and Fula populations. The Kati area formed part of the pre-colonial Beledougou region of the Mali Empire, Bambara Empire, and was amongst the first places colonised by the French in the last decade of the 19th century.

The Cercle falls largely south of the dryer Sahel land, in the wetter Sudan. Through it runs the fertile valley of the Niger River, home to groundnut, cotton, and tobacco farms, as well as being a major transportation and fishing resource.

Administrative subdivisions
The Kati Cercle is divided into 37 communes:

Baguinéda-Camp
Bancoumana
Bossofala
Bougoula
Daban
Diago
Dialakoroba
Dialakorodji
Diédougou
Dio-Gare
Dogodouman
Dombila
Doubabougou
Faraba
Kalabancoro
Kalifabougou
Kambila
Kati
Kourouba
Mandé
Moribabougou
Mountougoula
N'Gabacoro
N'Gouraba
N'Tjiba
Niagadina
Nioumamakana
Ouélessébougou
Safo
Sanankoro Djitoumou
Sanankoroba
Sangarébougou
Siby
Sobra
Tiakadougou-Dialakoro
Tiélé
Yélékébougou

References

Cercles of Mali
Koulikoro Region